Dichagyris acclivis is a moth of the family Noctuidae. It is found from southern Ontario and southern Massachusetts south to eastern Tennessee and western North Carolina, west to Illinois, Missouri, and Kansas and south to east central Texas. It is listed as a species of special concern in Connecticut.

The wingspan is about 32 mm. Adults are on wing from August to September.

The larvae feed on seeds of Panicum virgatum.

References

External links
Images
The Noctuinae (Lepidoptera: Noctuidae) of Great Smoky Mountains National Park, U.S.A.

acclivis
Moths of North America
Moths described in 1875